That's My Wife may refer to:

 That's My Wife (1929 film), an American comedy short featuring Laurel and Hardy
 That's My Wife (1933 film), a British film directed by Leslie S. Hiscott